Anosike Victor Ementa (born 3 May 2002) is a Danish professional footballer who plays as a forward for Danish Superliga club AaB.

Career

Helsingør
Ementa already made his debut in the Danish reserve league at the age of 15 against the reserve team of F.C. Copenhagen in August 2017. In November 2019, Ementa signed a new contract with Helsingør. He got his official debut for the club on 4 July 2020 in a Danish 2nd Division promotion play-off game against Jammerbugt FC.

Helsingør was promoted to the Danish 1st Division for the 2020-21 season. Ementa made two appearances in the 1st Division in December 2020, before he was sold.

AaB
On 27 January 2021 Danish Superliga club AaB confirmed, that they had signed Ementa on a deal until the end of 2023. Ementa was initially to be intended for a role on the club's U-19 team. However, he did not manage to make his debut for the U-19 team in his first season, after he in April 2021 had to undergo surgery for a fatigue fracture in his little toe.

Still, in the June 2021, he was promoted to the first team squad. On 22 November 2021, Ementa got his official debut for AaB against SønderjyskE in the Danish Superliga. Ementa came on the pitch 89th minute and managed to make the assist for AaB's last goal.

Personal life
Born in Denmark, Ementa is of Nigerian descent.

References

External links

2002 births
Living people
Danish men's footballers
Danish people of Nigerian descent
Association football forwards
Danish 1st Division players
Danish 2nd Division players
Danish Superliga players
FC Helsingør players
AaB Fodbold players
People from Gribskov Municipality
Sportspeople from the Capital Region of Denmark